Romana Chrenková (born 30 June 1987) is a Czech handballer playing for HC Veselí and the Czech national team.

References

1987 births
Living people
Czech female handball players
People from Frýdek-Místek
Sportspeople from the Moravian-Silesian Region
21st-century Czech women